Jonas Eika Rasmussen (born 1991) is a Danish writer.

He was born in Haslev, Denmark, in 1991. Eika made his literary debut in 2015, with the novel Lageret Huset Marie. He was awarded the Nordic Council Literature Prize 2019 for Efter Solen. An English edition, translated by Sherilyn Nicolette Hellberg, After the Sun, was longlisted for the 2022 Republic of Consciousness Prize.

References

1991 births
Living people
People from Faxe Municipality
Danish writers